The Roth-Rosenzweig House is a historic house at 717 West 2nd Avenue in Pine Bluff, Arkansas.  It is a -story wood-frame structure, with a wraparound porch and -story turret at the corner.  The porch is supported by Tuscan columns, and has a small decorated gable above the stairs.  The turret is clad in decoratively cut shingles, which are also banded on the main house gables.  The interior has well-preserved period woodwork and finishes.  The house was built in 1894, and is one Pine Bluff's finer examples of the Queen Anne style.

It was built by contractor W.S. Helton for $4,000.

The house was listed on the National Register of Historic Places in 1976.

See also
National Register of Historic Places listings in Jefferson County, Arkansas

References

Houses completed in 1894
Houses in Pine Bluff, Arkansas
Houses on the National Register of Historic Places in Arkansas
National Register of Historic Places in Pine Bluff, Arkansas
Queen Anne architecture in Arkansas